1 November 1954 Stadium, or officially Stade 1er-novembre-1954, is a multi-use stadium in Batna, Algeria. It is currently used mostly for football matches and is the home ground of MSP Batna of the Algerian Championnat National. The stadium holds 20,000 spectators.

The stadium is named for the date of the founding of the National Liberation Front, which obtained independence for Algeria from France.

Matches
The stadium has hosted one game of the Algeria national football team, against East Germany in 1985.

Club

National

See also 
Mustapha Seffouhi Stadium

References

External links
Stade 1er Novembre 1954 file - goalzz.com

1er Novembre
Batna, Algeria
Buildings and structures in Batna Province